The men's time trial class C5 road cycling event at the 2020 Summer Paralympics took place on 31 August 2021 at Fuji Speedway, Japan. 15 riders from 13 nations competed in this event.

The C5 classification is for cyclists with mild monoplegic spasticity; unilateral arm amputation (above or below elbow), etcetera.

Results
The event took place on 31 August 2021, at 13:47:

References

Men's road time trial C5